Sameer Rao, is an Indian flautist, who plays the Bansuri, the Indian bamboo flute. He is one of the prominent disciple of Pandit Hariprasad Chaurasia

Early life
Sameer Rao started his musical journey into Hindustani classical music and playing the Bansuri under the training of Pandit Veerabhadriah Hiremath at Mysore. He was chosen as a disciple by the world renowned flute wizard, Living legend, Padma Vibhushan, Pandit Hari Prasad Chaurasia. Under the guidance of the Panditji, he discovered the various aspects of Indian classical music and the nuances of playing the Bansuri. Sameer was a resident student of Vrindaban Gurukul, Mumbai that keeps alive to this day the ancient Guru-Shishya Parampara of the traditional Gurukul, trained under Pandit Hariprasad Chaurasia from the year 2004 to 2010.

Career
Sameer looked after the newly constructed Gurukul by his Guruji in Bhubaneswar, Orissa from 2010 to 2012. Here Sameer mentored the aspiring students of music and also took care of all the operational activities of Gurukul. Sameer is an "A" graded artist by AIR (All India Radio). He has been able to woo hearts through his music both in India and abroad. His versatility is evident at both individual concerts and Jugalbandis. Sameer also accompanies his Guruji, Pandit Hari Prasad Chaurasia, on his concerts. His Solo and World Music albums have been internationally released and has won the hearts of music lovers. At present Sameer lives in Mysore.

Awards and recognition
The Music and Dance Academy of Karnataka has awarded Sameer with a Scholarship during the year 1997-1998. Sameer was conferred with the "Yuva Pratibha" award by The Directorate of Kannada and Culture, Govt. of Karnataka, in 2004.Recognizing his mastery in Bansuri  Sri Guru Ganayogi Panchakshara Sangeet Yogashram Trust, Chennai chose him for the "Award of Excellence" in 2004 . Other awards include “NadaKIshore” by Nada Bramha Sangeeetha Sabha of Mysore in 2006 and “Surmani” by the Sur Singar Samsad of Mumbai, in 2008.

Discography
In the Moonlight - 2015 
Kaushi Kanada - 2015 
Shades of Bamboo - 2016 
Breathing Through Bansuri - 2016 
Mansoon Majesty - 2017 
Cosmic Conversations - 2017
Following his footsteps - 2018
Dhyaana - 2019
Panchabhoota-2019
Haripriaya -2020

References

1982 births
Living people
Indian flautists
Bansuri players
Hindustani instrumentalists
Indian male classical musicians
Musicians from Karnataka